George Town is the capital of the Malaysian state of Penang, and the eighth-most populous city proper in Malaysia. George Town is also the core city of the Greater Penang Conurbation, the second largest metropolitan area in the country with 2.833 million inhabitants, only surpassed by the Klang Valley.

Located next to the Straits of Malacca, George Town was established as an entrepôt by Francis Light of the East India Company in 1786, as the first British settlement in Southeast Asia. It grew rapidly in the early-19 century. With the influx of immigrants from various regions in Asia, George Town's population surpassed 10,000 by the turn of the 19th century and quadrupled within 40 years. In 1826, Penang was incorporated into the Straits Settlements, along with British Singapore and Malacca, with George Town as the territories' administrative capital until 1836. The territories became a British crown colony in 1867. During the Second World War, George Town was subjugated by the Empire of Japan, before being recaptured by the British at war's end. Shortly before Malaya attained independence from the British in 1957, George Town was declared a city by Queen Elizabeth II, making it the first city in the country's modern history. In 1974, the Malaysian federal government revoked George Town's city status after the abolishment of local governments, a position that would not be altered until 2015, when its jurisdiction was reinstated and expanded to cover the entirety of Penang Island.

The port city was historically a regional centre of administration, politics, and finance. During the Napoleonic Wars, George Town was a military outpost, and later spawned the early ground-works of the Malaysian judiciary, and the Royal Malaysian Police. Its municipal council was the first elected local government in Malayan history. Despite losing its prominence to Singapore in trade by the mid-19th century, it remained as a major export hub of spices, agricultural goods, and later tin, achieving immense prosperity throughout the 19th-century. Such successes made George Town the financial centre of Malaya, home to several regional and international banks of the early-20th century, notably Standard Chartered, HSBC, Royal Bank of Scotland, the Netherlands Trading Society, and Ban Hin Lee Bank. George Town also functioned as the headquarters for revolutionary activities by the Tongmenghui in Southeast Asia that eventually launched the Wuchang Uprising, a precursor towards the Xinhai Revolution in Qing China.

In the modern era, George Town is an important hub of arts, culture, manufacturing, transportation, education, healthcare, and media in Malaysia. It is still the financial centre of northern Peninsular Malaysia, and since the 1970s, the Bayan Lepas Free Industrial Zone, a high-tech manufacturing hub regarded as the "Silicon Valley of the East", became the centre of the Malaysian electronics manufacturing industry. George Town also serves as the country's primary medical tourism hub. The Penang International Airport links George Town with several major regional cities, while a ferry service, the Penang Bridge and the Second Penang Bridge connect the city with the rest of Peninsular Malaysia. Meanwhile, George Town's Swettenham Pier has emerged as the busiest port of call in Malaysia for cruise ships. George Town is also the birthplace of Malaysian print media; The Prince of Wales Island Gazette, one of Southeast Asia's oldest newspapers, was first published in George Town in 1805. Stemming from the centuries of intermingling of the various ethnicities and religions that arrived on its shores, George Town acquired its own unique architectural styles and cuisine. It has also gained a reputation as modern Malaysia's gastronomical capital for its distinct and ubiquitous street food. The preservation of these cultures contributed to the city centre's inscription as a UNESCO World Heritage Site since 2008.

Etymology
The city's name comes from the original British settlement that was named in honour of King George III. The area before this has also been named "Tanjung Penaga" due to the abundance of a tree called penaga laut (Calophyllum inophyllum) found in the present town's cape (tanjung). It is often erroneously spelt "Georgetown", which was never the city's official name; such misspelling may have arisen in confusion with other places having the same name.

History

Establishment
In the 1770s, the British East India Company instructed Francis Light, a British Royal Navy captain, to form trade relations in the Malay Peninsula. Light subsequently landed in Kedah, a Siamese vassal state threatened by both Siam and Burma, as well as an internal Bugis revolt. Aware of this situation, Light formed friendly relations with the then Sultan of Kedah, Sultan Muhammad Jiwa Zainal Adilin II, and promised British military protection, while the Sultan reciprocally offered Penang Island, then part of Kedah.

Although Light subsequently reported on this offer to his superiors, it was only in 1786 when he was finally ordered to obtain Penang Island from Kedah. The British East India Company sought control of the island as a Royal Navy base, and as a trading post between China and India. To that end, Light negotiated with the new Sultan of Kedah, Sultan Abdullah Mukarram Shah, regarding the cession of the island to the British East India Company in exchange for British military aid. After an agreement was signed between Light and the Sultan, Light and his entourage sailed on to Penang Island, where they arrived on 17 July 1786.

The area where Light first landed, which is now the Esplanade, was originally a swamp covered in thick jungle. Once the area was cleared, a simple ceremony was held on 11 August, during which the Union Jack was raised. Penang Island was renamed the Prince of Wales Island after the heir to the British throne, while the new settlement was given the name George Town.

Light developed George Town as a free port, thus allowing merchants to trade without having to pay any form of tax or duties. The policy's intent was to entice traders from the Dutch ports in the region. The number of incoming vessels rose from 85 in 1786 to 3,569 in 1802; George Town's population had also increased to 10,000 by 1792.

A committee of assessors was established in 1800, making it the first local council to be established in British Malaya. Meanwhile, a Supreme Court was established at Fort Cornwallis in 1808.

Colonial era 

In the early 19th century, Penang Island became a centre of spice production within Southeast Asia. Spices such as nutmeg, clove and pepper, produced from the spice farms throughout the island, were exported via the Port of Penang in George Town. The spice trade also allowed the British East India Company to cover the administrative costs of Penang.

In 1826, George Town was made the capital of the Straits Settlements, an administrative polity that was also composed of Singapore and Malacca. However, the capital was then shifted to Singapore in 1832, as the latter had usurped George Town's position as the region's preeminent harbour.

Nonetheless, George Town retained its importance as a vital British entrepôt. Due to the opening of the Suez Canal, the advent of steam ships and a tin mining boom in the Malay Peninsula, the Port of Penang became a major tin-exporting harbour. By the end of the 19th century, as mercantile firms and banks, including Standard Chartered and HSBC, flocked into George Town, the city also evolved into a leading financial centre in Malaya.

Throughout the century, George Town's population grew rapidly in tandem with the city's economic prosperity. A cosmopolitan, multi-cultural population emerged, comprising Chinese, Malay, Indian, Peranakan, Eurasian, Thai and other ethnicities. However, the population growth also created social problems, such as inadequate sanitation and public health facilities, as well as rampant crime. The latter culminated in the Penang Riots of 1867, during which rival Chinese triads clashed in the streets of George Town.

Also in the same year, the Straits Settlements was made a British crown colony, to be governed directly by the Colonial Office in London. For George Town, direct British rule meant better law enforcement, as the police force was vastly improved and the secret societies that had previously plagued the city were gradually outlawed. More investments were also made on the city's health care and public transportation.

With improved access to education, a greater level of participation in municipal affairs by its Asian residents and substantial press freedom, George Town was perceived as being more intellectually receptive than Singapore. The city became a magnet for well known English authors, Asian intellectuals and revolutionaries, including Rudyard Kipling, Somerset Maugham and Sun Yat-sen.

World Wars 

World War II, on the other hand, brought unparalleled social and political upheaval to Penang. In early December 1941, Japanese warplanes indiscriminately strafed and bombed George Town, and wiped out the defending Allied air squadrons. While the British Army had earlier designated Penang Island as a fortress, Lieutenant-General Arthur Percival then ordered a withdrawal from Penang. Not only did the British abandon the Batu Maung Fort south of the city, they also covertly evacuated Penang's European population, leaving the rest of the populace to their fates. Some historians have argued that the withdrawal and the silent evacuation of the European population led to the loss of the British sense of invincibility, and that the collapse of British rule in Southeast Asia came not in Singapore, but in Penang.

George Town fell to the Imperial Japanese Army on 19 December 1941, marking the start of a brutal period of Japanese occupation. Penang Island was renamed Tojo-to, after the then Japanese Prime Minister Hideki Tojo. This period was known for the Imperial Japanese Army's massacres of Penang's Chinese populace, known as Sook Ching to the locals. Women in George Town were also coerced to work as comfort women by the Japanese.

George Town's harbour facilities were also put to use as a major U-boat base by Nazi Germany. Between 1942 and 1944, the Port of Penang was utilised by submarines of the Imperial Japanese Navy, the Kriegsmarine and the Regia Marina.

Between 1944 and 1945, Allied bombers based in India repeatedly bombed George Town, seeking to destroy the naval facilities and administrative centres. Several colonial buildings were destroyed or damaged, including the Government Offices, St. Xavier's Institution, Hutchings School (now Penang State Museum) and the Penang Secretariat Building. The Penang Strait was also mined to impede Japanese shipping.

Following the Japanese surrender on 15 August 1945, the Penang Shimbun, a Japanese newspaper, published the proclamation of surrender issued by the Emperor of Japan. Under Operation Jurist, the British Royal Marines accepted the surrender of the Japanese garrison in Penang and retook Penang Island on 3 September 1945.

Post-war 

After a period of military administration, the British dissolved the Straits Settlements in 1946 and proceeded to merge the Crown Colony of Penang into the Malayan Union, which was then replaced with the Federation of Malaya in 1948. However, the absorption of the British colony of Penang into Malaya alarmed Penang's population over economic and ethnic concerns. Between 1948 and 1951, the Penang Secessionist Committee was formed to avert Penang's merger with Malaya, but ultimately petered out due to British disapproval.

The British government responded to the concerns raised by the secessionists by guaranteeing George Town's free port status, as well as reintroducing municipal elections in George Town in 1951. By 1956, George Town had become the first municipality in the Malayan Federation to have a fully elected local council.

On 1 January 1957, George Town was accorded city status by Queen Elizabeth II, becoming the first city within the Federation of Malaya, and by extension, Malaysia.

Post-independence 

In the following years, George Town retained its free port status, as guaranteed by the British colonial authorities before granting independence to Malaya. This was not to last, however – in 1969, the Malaysian federal government revoked George Town's free port status, sparking massive unemployment in the city.

This also marked the start of George Town's decline, which lasted up to the early 2000s. As the Malaysian federal government continued to develop Kuala Lumpur and nearby Port Klang, Penang began to suffer considerable brain drain.

In a bid to revitalise George Town, the Komtar project was launched in 1974. Hundreds of shophouses, schools and temples, as well as whole streets, were demolished in order to make way for the construction of Penang's tallest skyscraper. However, instead of arresting George Town's decline, Komtar itself became a white elephant by the 2000s.

In 1974, the George Town City Council was merged with the Penang Island Rural District Council to form the Penang Island Municipal Council, sparking a decades-long debate over George Town's city status.

Renaissance 

The city's decline continued into the early 2000s. In 2001, the Rent Control Act, which had protected the low-income residents and smaller businesses within the city centre from arbitrary rental hikes, was repealed. Consequently, residents moved out of the city's historical core, leaving its colonial-era buildings in disrepair. Meanwhile, an incoherent urban planning policy and poor traffic management led to worsening traffic congestion, while decades of brain drain also took its toll as the city lacked the expertise to regulate urban development.

In response, George Town's non-governmental organisations and the national press galvanised public support and formed strategic partnerships for the conservation of the historic buildings, and to restore the city to its former glory. As a result of the widespread resentment over George Town's decline, the then federal opposition coalition, Pakatan Rakyat (now Pakatan Harapan), was voted into power within Penang in the 2008 State Election.

Also in 2008, George Town was inscribed as a UNESCO World Heritage Site. Subsequent efforts to clean up the city, and measures to improve traffic flow, cultural and environmental aspects by the new state government led to George Town being ranked Asia's 8th most liveable city by ECA International in 2010. The city's services sector has since been boosted by the private sector and an influx of foreign investors.

The Indian Ocean tsunami which struck in 2004 hit the western and northern coasts of Penang Island, including George Town, claiming 52 lives (out of 68 in Malaysia).

Whilst George Town had been declared a city by Queen Elizabeth II in 1957, the jurisdiction of the city was expanded by the Malaysian federal government to encompass the entirety of Penang Island in 2015.

Geography 

The contiguous hotel and resort belts of Batu Ferringhi and Tanjung Bungah and Tanjung Tokong along the northern beaches of Penang Island form the northwestern fringes of George Town. The central hills of Penang Island, including Penang Hill, serve as a giant green lung for George Town and an important forested catchment area. While the central hills have somewhat limited the westward urban sprawl, George Town's expansion is more evident southward along the eastern seaboard of Penang Island, creating the suburbs of Jelutong and Gelugor, the latter merging with the northward development of Bayan Lepas.

As with most island cities, land scarcity is a pressing issue in George Town. Land reclamation projects have been carried out to provide more low-lying land at high-demand areas, such as at Gurney Drive, Tanjung Tokong and Jelutong.

Cityscape

UNESCO World Heritage Site 
The oldest portion of the city centre has been designated by UNESCO as a World Heritage Site since 2008. Recognised as having a "unique architectural and cultural townscape without parallel anywhere in East and Southeast Asia", George Town contains one of the largest collections of pre-war buildings in Southeast Asia.

The zone includes the city's administrative precinct, which is home to the most historic landmarks like Fort Cornwallis, City Hall and the Penang State Museum, as well as the main Central Business District along Beach Street. The zone also covers various places of worship, such as St. George's Church, the Kapitan Keling Mosque and the Goddess of Mercy Temple, as well as the Cheong Fatt Tze Mansion and the Eastern & Oriental Hotel.

Among the restrictions in force within the zone is a ban on the construction of any structure exceeding  in height, and that any new building which is located adjacent to a historically important structure must not exceed the height of the latter.

Street names 
Unlike other cities in Malaysia, George Town still retains most of its English street names. Even for roads that have been renamed in Malay, such as Jalan Masjid Negeri, Penangites in general still prefer to use the road's former colonial name, which in this particular case is Green Lane. This is partly because the new names are often unwieldy (e.g. Pitt Street vs Jalan Masjid Kapitan Keling, Northam Road vs Jalan Sultan Ahmad Shah), but also reflects a strong conservatism in the local population, who see Penang's colonial history as part of their local identity.

Since 2008, multi-lingual road signs have been in use throughout Penang Island. Each of the new road signs shows the street's official Malay name and either the street's English, Chinese, Tamil or Arabic name.

Suburbs 
The expansion of George Town has created suburbs to its northwest, west and south. The northwestern suburbs are somewhat more affluent, given their seafront locations which attract tourists and expatriates. The southern suburbs, such as Jelutong, grew due to industrial activities. On the other hand, Air Itam and Paya Terubong emerged to the west of George Town as a result of agricultural plantations on the central hills of Penang Island.

Since the 1970s, massive industrialisation around Bayan Lepas, which created the Bayan Lepas Free Industrial Zone, led to the rapid urbanisation of the southeastern corner of Penang Island as well. The western half of the island, where Balik Pulau forms the main population centre, remains sparsely-populated, although urbanisation has encroached into the area in recent years.

Beaches and seafronts 

The most popular beaches of George Town are situated along the city's northwestern suburbs, specifically Batu Ferringhi, Tanjung Bungah and Tanjung Tokong. Several hotels and resorts have been established along these locations, including Hard Rock Hotel. Aside from these, George Town is home to popular promenades such as Gurney Drive, the Esplanade and Karpal Singh Drive. In particular, Gurney Drive forms part of the city's second Central Business District, and is a shopping haven with two upmarket shopping malls – Gurney Plaza and Gurney Paragon. Land reclamation is currently ongoing off Gurney Drive in a state-led effort to create a seafront public park, named Gurney Wharf.

Hills 
The central hills of Penang Island, situated to the west of George Town, serve as a gigantic green lung and water catchment area for the urbanised island. Once a retreat used by British officials and Queen Elizabeth II, Penang Hill is one of Penang's most well-known tourist attractions.

Parks 

Founded in 1884 as an offshoot of the Singapore Botanic Gardens, the Penang Botanic Gardens is Malaysia's oldest botanical garden. Today, it serves as a major recreational area, receiving about 5,000 visitors every weekend. This botanical garden also encompasses Penang's biggest waterfall, which forms part of George Town's water supply. Meanwhile, the nearby  City Park was officially opened in 1972.

The city is also home to the world's smallest national park – the Penang National Park. Covering  of the northwestern tip of Penang Island, it contains mangrove swamps, rainforest interspersed with hiking trails and tranquil beaches. Other notable natural attractions nearby include the Tropical Spice Garden and the Entopia Butterfly Farm, the latter of which was Malaysia's first butterfly sanctuary.

Climate
The city features a tropical rainforest climate, under the Köppen climate classification (Af).

George Town's proximity to the island of Sumatra makes it susceptible to dust particles carried by wind from the perennial but transient forest fires, creating a yearly phenomenon known as the Southeast Asian haze.

Weather forecast in George Town is served by the Penang Meteorological Office in Bayan Lepas, which acts as the primary weather forecast facility for northern Peninsular Malaysia.

Governance and politics

Local government 
Local administration of George Town and all of Penang Island is carried out by the Penang Island City Council, which comes under the purview of the Penang state government. With a history dating back to 1800, it is Malaysia's oldest local government and the successor to the nation's first city council – the George Town City Council.

Headquartered in the City Hall, the city council is responsible for urban planning, heritage preservation, public health, sanitation, waste management, traffic management, environmental protection, building control, social and economic development, and general maintenance of urban infrastructure. In 2018, George Town was recognised as one of the cleanest cities in ASEAN, following a 2017 ranking which placed George Town as Malaysia's second cleanest city.

The Mayor of Penang Island is appointed by the Penang state government every two years, while each of the 24 councillors is appointed for a one-year term. The current Mayor is Yew Tung Seang, who took office in 2018. Penang-based non-governmental organisations are also allocated four of the 24 councillor positions.

State government 

As the capital of the State of Penang, George Town is the seat of the Penang state government. The Office of the Chief Minister of Penang is housed within the Komtar Tower, Penang's tallest skyscraper. The unicameral Penang State Legislative Assembly convenes inside the State Assembly Building at Light Street. The Governor of Penang, the head of state, also has his official residence within the city.

In the State Legislative Assembly, George Town is represented by 19 state constituencies, namely Padang Kota, Pengkalan Kota, Komtar, Kebun Bunga, Pulau Tikus, Tanjong Bunga, Air Putih, Air Itam, Paya Terubong, Seri Delima, Datok Keramat, Sungai Pinang, Batu Lancang, Batu Uban, Pantai Jerejak, Batu Maung, Bayan Lepas, Pulau Betong and Telok Bahang. The members of the State Legislative Assembly, known as State Assemblymen, are elected into office via the Penang State Election, which by convention is held simultaneously with the Malaysian General Election every five years.

The city is also represented by six Members of Parliament in the Malaysian Parliament, who are elected via the Malaysian General Election. The parliamentary constituencies are Tanjong, Bukit Bendera, Jelutong, Bukit Gelugor, Bayan Baru and Balik Pulau.

Judiciary 

The Malaysian legal system had its roots in George Town. By 1807, Penang was accorded a Royal Charter which provided for the establishment of a Supreme Court and the appointment of the first Supreme Court judge, designated as the Recorder.

The Supreme Court of Penang (now High Court of Penang) was first opened at Fort Cornwallis on 31 May 1808. Edmond Stanley assumed office as the First Recorder of the Supreme Court of Penang in 1808, thus serving as Malaya's first Superior Court Judge. The Supreme Court was then relocated a short distance away to Light Street, where the present building was built in 1903.

Today, the Malaysian judiciary has become largely centralised. The courts in George Town consist of the Magistrates, Sessions and the High Court, the latter of which sits at the top of Penang's judicial system. The High Court remains at Light Street to this day, along with the Magistrates and Sessions Court across the street. Another Sessions Court has also been established in Balik Pulau to the west.

Demographics
According to the 2010 Census conducted by the Malaysian federal government, George Town had a population of 708,127. More recent estimates from Malaysia's Department of Statistics indicated that about 738,500 inhabitants lived within this cosmopolitan city . These figures placed George Town as Malaysia's second largest city by population.

In addition, Greater Penang, which also covers Seberang Perai, and parts of neighbouring Kedah and Perak, was home to 2,412,616 residents . Thus, Greater Penang is the most populous metropolitan area in Malaysia outside the Klang Valley (Greater Kuala Lumpur).

Ethnicities
The Bumiputeras, which include ethnic Malays and East Malaysian indigenous races like the Dayaks and Kadazans, collectively made up almost 32% of the city's population. Ethnic Indians comprised another 9% of George Town's population. These are in addition to small, but prominent, Eurasian and Siamese minorities. In particular, most of the nearly 1,500 Eurasians remain concentrated at the Pulau Tikus suburb.The Peranakans, descendants of mixed Malay and Chinese ancestries, were once the political and business elites in George Town. They held the top positions in some of the city's most influential associations, such as the Penang Chinese Chamber of Commerce and the Penang Straits Chinese British Association. As the Peranakans tended to be more loyal to the British Crown than to China, they were also known as the King's Chinese. In spite of Malaysia's ethnic policies that have effectively forced the Peranakans to identify themselves as Chinese, Peranakan culture still thrives in George Town to this day, in the form of Straits Chinese architectural styles and dishes like asam laksa.

George Town currently has a sizeable expatriate population, especially from Singapore, Japan and various Asian countries as well as the United Kingdom, many of whom chose to retire in Penang as part of Malaysia My Second Home programme. In recent years, George Town has been acknowledged as one of the best cities for retirement within Southeast Asia by the likes of CNN and Forbes. , expatriates made up nearly 6% of George Town's population, reflecting the city's popularity amongst foreigners.

The city was also once home to Burmese, Filipino, Sinhalese, Japanese, Sumatran, Arab, Armenian and Persian communities. A small but commercially significant community of German merchants existed in George Town as well, as did a Jewish enclave. Even though most of these other communities, including the Jews, are no longer extant, they lent their legacy to numerous street and place names such as the Dhammikarama Temple, Burmah Road, Armenian Street, Jewish Cemetery and Gottlieb Road.

Languages
As with other multi-ethnic cities in Malaysia, all four major languages are widely spoken in George Town – Malay, English, Mandarin and Tamil. However, George Town, and by extension Penang, is best known for its distinct Hokkien dialect, known as Penang Hokkien.

During the British colonial era, English was the official language. This was helped by the mushrooming of missionary schools throughout George Town, all of which used English as their medium of instruction and were held in high esteem by the locals. Most Penangites still maintain reasonable command of the language; while British English is formally used, spoken English usually takes the form of Manglish.

As in the rest of Malaysia, Malay is currently the official language in George Town. The city's Malays also use a variant of the Kedah Malay dialect, with slight modifications made to the original dialect to suit the conditions of a cosmopolitan city. These modifications include the use of words of Indian (Hindi/Urdu/Tamil), English, and Arabic origin, the alteration of final "l" into "i" (also the standard in Kedah Malay), and expressions calqued from Tamil, as well as original words and idiomatic forms unique to the George Town area.

Due to their Tamil/South Indian ancestry, most Indians in George Town speak Tamil. Punjabi and Telugu are also spoken by a very smaller numbers of Indians.

Mandarin, more widely used by youths, has been the medium of instruction in Chinese schools throughout Penang.

However, Penang Hokkien serves as the lingua franca of George Town. Originally a variant of the Minnan dialect, over the centuries, Penang Hokkien has incorporated a large number of loanwords from Malay and English. It is spoken by many Penangites regardless of race for communication purposes. In recent years, there have been more efforts to maintain the dialect's relevance in the face of the increasing influence of Mandarin and English among the younger populace.

Economy
As the capital city of Penang, one of the most urbanised states in Malaysia, George Town is one of the top contributors of Malaysia's Gross Domestic Product (GDP) and tax income. According to the Economist Intelligence Unit, the city contributed US$12,044, or nearly 8%, of Malaysia's personal disposable income in 2015, second only to Kuala Lumpur. In 2016, George Town was ranked Malaysia's most attractive destination for commercial property investment by Knight Frank, surpassing even Kuala Lumpur. By 2017, Penang's GDP per capita, already the highest among Malaysian states, rose to RM49,873, thereby surpassing the World Bank's threshold to be considered a high-income economy. George Town's popularity amongst foreign investors has contributed to Penang gaining the largest share of Malaysia's foreign direct investments within the same year.

Originally established as an entrepôt by the British, George Town's economy is now dominated by other tertiary sub-sectors ranging from manufacturing to finance, whilst newer industries, including entrepreneurial startups, are taking root within the city as well. In addition, George Town serves as the economic pole of northern Malaysia, with relatively wide logistical connectivity. The Penang International Airport is one of the nation's busiest, whilst Swettenham Pier has cemented the city's reputation as a popular destination for cruise shipping.

Manufacturing 

Since the 1970s, manufacturing formed the backbone of Penang's economy, generating 44.8% of the state's GDP  and attracting about 3,000 firms to set up operations within the state. The Bayan Lepas Free Industrial Zone, dubbed the Silicon Valley of the East, is the main electronics manufacturing hub within Malaysia. Located at the southeastern corner of Penang Island, the zone is home to various high-tech multinational firms, including Dell, Intel, AMD, Motorola, Agilent, Renesas, Osram, Bosch, Sony and Seagate.

Finance 

George Town was the centre of banking in Malaysia at a time when Kuala Lumpur was still a small outpost. The oldest bank in Malaysia, Standard Chartered, opened its main branch in George Town in 1875 to cater to the financial requirements of early European traders. This was followed by HSBC in 1885 and the Royal Bank of Scotland in 1888.

Today, George Town remains the banking hub of northern Malaysia, with branches of major international banks such as Standard Chartered, HSBC, Citibank, UOB, OCBC, Bank of China and Bank Negara Malaysia (Malaysian central bank). Most of the foreign banks still maintain their Penang headquarters at Beach Street, which serves as the city's main Central Business District.

Since the 1990s, Northam Road, along with Gurney Drive, has evolved into George Town's second Central Business District. Northam Road is now home to a cluster of financial services, with a number of accounting, auditing and insurance firms based along this coastal road. In addition to these, the Employees Provident Fund, run by the Malaysian federal government, operates an office at the road as well.

The financial sector and its related industries, such as insurance, auditing and real estate transactions, accounted for over 8% of Penang's Gross Domestic Product (GDP) .

Tourism 

George Town has always been one of the most popular tourist destinations in Malaysia. Throughout history, the city has even welcomed some of the most influential personalities, including Somerset Maugham, Rudyard Kipling, Noël Coward, Lee Kuan Yew and Queen Elizabeth II.In recent years, George Town has received numerous international accolades, further putting the city on the world stage. The city has been listed by various publications, including the Lonely Planet, Forbes and Time, as one of the top travel destinations in Asia. These are in addition to George Town's reputation as a gastronomic haven, with the CNN placing the city as one of Asia's best street food cities.

Unlike most other Malaysian cities, George Town does not rely only on air transportation for tourist arrivals. Aside from the Penang International Airport, Swettenham Pier, conveniently located within the city centre, also serves as one of the major tourist entry points into Penang. , Penang attracted almost 8.6 million tourists, with the airport posting a record 7.2 million passenger arrivals and the pier registering another 1.35 million tourist arrivals. Within the same year, Penang became the third largest contributor of Malaysia's tourism tax revenue after Kuala Lumpur and Sabah.

The state government launched its ten-year Penang Tourism Master Plan in February 2019 with the goal of ensuring sustainable development and making Penang a hub for tourism, heritage, culture and arts in the region. George Town World Heritage Incorporated – the state government's independent heritage agency responsible for managing the George Town World Heritage Site – has produced a Sustainable Tourism Strategy action plan.

Services 

The largest share of employment was recorded in the retail, accommodation, and food and beverages (F&B) sub-sectors, clearly depicting the influence of tourist arrivals on service-related industries. Since the inscription of George Town as a UNESCO World Heritage Site, an emerging trend is the acquisition of heritage shophouses within the zone by foreign investors, especially from Singapore and Hong Kong.

In addition, a startup community has been growing in the city, which include the likes of Piktochart and DeliverEat. Attracted by the city's cheaper living costs and the presence of several multinational technology firms in Penang, the city's startups are also being actively encouraged by the Penang state government and the private sector, with initiatives to encourage entrepreneurship and promote the Internet of Things (IoT).

This services sector has also been boosted by firms seeking to establish shared services outsourcing (SSO) operations within or around George Town, including AirAsia, Citigroup, Dell, Jabil and Temasek Holdings. Consequently, Penang has emerged as the second most important Global Business Services (GBS) hub within Malaysia, after Kuala Lumpur.

Medical tourism 
An integral part of Penang's services sector is medical tourism, which has made George Town the medical tourism hub of Malaysia. The city has attracted approximately half of Malaysia's medical tourist arrivals in 2013 and generated about 70% of the nation's medical tourism revenue. About 1,000 patients arrive in George Town daily, mostly from Asian countries such as Indonesia, Singapore and Japan.

The success of George Town's medical tourism industry is mainly due to the specialised medical treatments offered at more affordable costs by the city's numerous private hospitals, coupled with well-trained professionals and advanced equipment. Indirect factors that were cited include the relatively low cost of living and the ease of travel facilitated by the well-developed logistical infrastructure.

Retail 
As many as 24% of Penang's workforce are employed in the retail sub-sector, the largest of all economic sub-sectors in Penang. Due to the numerous shopping malls and hypermarkets in George Town, the city is the main shopping hub of northern Malaysia. Since 2001, shopping complexes in George Town registered the biggest increases in Malaysia. Among the more well-known shopping malls within the city are Gurney Plaza, Gurney Paragon, 1st Avenue and Queensbay Mall.

While shopping malls now dominate the retail scene in George Town, many centuries-old shophouses are still operating alongside the city's flea markets and wet markets, such as Chowrasta Market.

Architecture 
Centuries of development have brought a mix of architectural styles to George Town, both historical and modern. The oldest portion of the city centre is a UNESCO World Heritage Site, while outside the UNESCO zone lies the modern cityscape, with skyscrapers, residential high-rises, office blocks and shopping malls built all over the city.

Historic architecture 

Most of George Town's famous heritage landmarks, including Fort Cornwallis, the City Hall, the High Court, St. George's Church and the Eastern & Oriental Hotel are located within the UNESCO World Heritage Site. The city's main Central Business District at Beach Street, also within the UNESCO zone, is home to banks built in various Art Deco-based hybrid styles. Colonial-era bungalows, such as The Residency and Suffolk House, can be found throughout the city as well.

Aside from colonial European architecture, a huge assortment of Asian architectural styles also exist throughout the city. Buildings like the Kapitan Keling Mosque, Kong Hock Keong Temple, Cheong Fatt Tze Mansion and the Pinang Peranakan Mansion are notable for their architectural styles, which combine diverse cultural influences. Peranakan townhouses, exemplified by the Sun Yat-sen Museum, dominate the cityscape as well. Meanwhile, Indian architecture is more prominent within the city's Little India, which also contains the Sri Mahamariamman Temple.

In the suburbs, the Siamese and Burmese communities have left their mark too; the Buddhist temples at Pulau Tikus include Wat Chaiyamangkalaram and the Dhammikarama Temple. Another example of a hybrid Asian architecture is the Kek Lok Si Temple at Air Itam, which merges Chinese, Siamese and Burmese influences.

Modern architecture 
Since the mid 20th century, modern urbanisation has transformed much of George Town. The second Central Business District at Northam Road and Gurney Drive, which lies along the city's northern shoreline, is also home to some of Penang's tallest skyscrapers, including Setia V, Gurney Paragon and BHL Tower.

With increasing urbanisation, high-rises are also springing up within the suburbs of George Town.

Culture

Food 

George Town, long known as the food capital of Malaysia, is renowned for its good and varied street food, incorporating Malay, Chinese, Indian, Peranakan, Thai and European influences into its literal melting pot.

The city has been recognised as one of Asia's top street food cities by CNN, as well the world's top culinary destination by the Lonely Planet in 2014. These were in addition to the Time magazine in 2004, which acclaimed Penang as having the best street food in Asia.

The best places to savour street cuisine include Gurney Drive, Pulau Tikus, Chulia Street, Kimberley Street, New Lane, New World Park, Penang Road and Air Itam. The more prominent local dishes include asam laksa, char kway teow, curry mee, Hokkien mee, nasi kandar, oh chien (fried oyster omelette), rojak and chendol. Besides these, several  shops can be found throughout the city, selling bean paste biscuits.

Performance arts 

George Town is the birthplace of a unique form of Chingay procession, which began with its first parade in 1919. Penang's variant of Chingay includes the act of balancing gigantic flags on one's forehead or hands. An annual Chingay parade is held in the city every December, though Chingay performances are also a common feature of Chinese festivities and major state celebrations in Penang.

Bangsawan is a form of Malay theatre which was developed in Penang with Indian, Western, Islamic, Chinese and Indonesian influences. It went into decline in the latter decades of the 20th century and is now a dying art form. Boria is another traditional dance drama indigenous to Penang, featuring singing accompanied by violin, maracas and tabla.

Aside from these, there are two Western orchestras based in George Town – the Penang Philharmonic and the Penang Symphony Orchestra (PSO) – as well as several chamber and school-based musical ensembles. Dewan Sri Pinang and Penangpac within Straits Quay are two of the major performing venues in the city.

Street art 
In 2012, as part of the annual George Town Festival, Lithuanian artist Ernest Zacharevic created a series of wall murals depicting local culture, inhabitants and lifestyles. They now stand as celebrated cultural landmarks of George Town, with Children on a Bicycle becoming one of the most photographed spots in the city.

Since then, the street art scene has blossomed. Arts exhibitions are held at the city's numerous cultural centres, such as the Hin Bus Depot. Aside from wall art, several wrought iron caricatures, each depicting a unique aspect of George Town's history and culture, have been installed throughout the city centre.

Museums 
The Penang State Museum and Art Gallery houses relics, photographs, maps, and other artifacts that document the history and culture of Penang. Other museums within the city focus on religious and cultural aspects, as well as famous personalities, including the Penang Islamic Museum, Sun Yat-sen Museum, P. Ramlee's House, Batik Painting Museum, and Universiti Sains Malaysia Museum and Gallery.

In recent years, private-run museums have sprung up all over the city, such as the Camera Museum and the Penang Toy Museum. A handful of newer visual museums have also been launched, such as the Made-in-Penang Interactive Museum and the Penang Time Tunnel.

Festivals 
George Town's cultural melting pot of various races and religions means that there are a great many celebrations and festivities in any given year. The major cultural and religious festivities in George Town include, but not limited to, the Chinese New Year, Chap Goh Meh, Songkran, Wesak Day, Seventh Month Festival, Nine Emperor Gods Festival, Eid ul-Fitri, Deepavali, Thaipusam, Vaisakhi and Christmas.

The city's expatriates have introduced a host of other celebrations as well. Bon Odori is celebrated yearly at the Esplanade by the Japanese, while St. Patrick's Day and Oktoberfest, traditionally celebrated by the Irish and the Germans respectively, have also been gaining popularity amongst the locals.

In addition, the city hosts several major festivals in any given year. The George Town Festival, first held in 2010, has evolved into one of the top arts events in Southeast Asia, while the Penang Hot Air Balloon Fiesta attracts close to 200,000 visitors from all over the world.

Sports 

George Town has a relatively well-developed sporting infrastructure. The City Stadium is Penang Island's main football stadium, with a capacity of about 25,000. It is the home ground of Penang FA, and was where Penang footballer Mohd Faiz Subri scored the goal that won him the 2016 FIFA Puskás Award. The SPICE Arena at Bayan Baru consists of an indoor stadium, an aquatics centre and a convention centre, while the Nicol David International Squash Centre at Gelugor is a major squash training facility. In addition, the Penang Turf Club, established in 1864, is Malaysia's oldest horse racing and equestrian centre.[232]

The Penang Bridge International Marathon is a popular annual event. The full marathon route starts from near Queensbay Mall, then on to the  length of the Penang Bridge, and finally back to the starting point for the finish.

The national and international sporting events that were held in George Town include the 2001 Southeast Asian Games and the 2013 Women's World Open Squash Championship. In addition, George Town will host the Asia Pacific Masters Games in 2018, the first Malaysian city to be selected to host this regional multi-sports tournament.

Education 

George Town is home to some of the oldest schools in Malaysia, making it a pioneer in the country's education system. Under British rule, missionary schools were set up across George Town. They were followed by Chinese schools, some of which are also among the oldest in the nation, thus making George Town the nucleus of Chinese education in Southeast Asia. More recently, international schools have also been established to cater to the growing expatriate population.

In addition, George Town contains a number of private tertiary educational institutions, as well as one of the premier Malaysian public universities – Universiti Sains Malaysia. Aside from these, the city has a handful of language institutions, such as the British Council, Alliance Française and the Malaysian German Society.

Schools 

There are a total of 117 primary schools, 49 high schools, four Islamic religious schools, two vocational colleges and a technical school throughout George Town. The breakdown of these schools is as follows.

Some of the oldest missionary schools in George Town include the Penang Free School, St. Xavier's Institution, Convent Light Street, St. George's Girls' School and Methodist Boys' School. Meanwhile, the Chung Hwa Confucian School, founded in 1904, was the first Chinese school in Southeast Asia.

Aside from government-run and private schools, the city has 11 international schools. Of these, Dalat, Uplands, Tenby, Fairview, Pelita, Hua Xia and Wesley Methodist offer both primary and secondary education. The Penang Japanese School is the only international school in George Town that caters for expatriates of a specific nationality.

Tertiary education 
 Universiti Sains Malaysia, situated at Gelugor, is one of the premier Malaysian public universities. Established in 1969 as Malaysia's second university, it was originally named Universiti Pulau Pinang (University of Penang). , it was ranked 207th in the QS World University Rankings, the fourth highest in Malaysia.

Several private universities and colleges have also been set up across George Town, including Wawasan Open University, Royal College of Surgeons in Ireland and University College Dublin Malaysia Campus, Han Chiang University College of Communication, DISTED College, SEGi College, Sentral College, Lam Wah Ee Nursing College, Adventist College of Nursing and Health Sciences, Equator Academy of Arts and KDU University College.

Libraries 

George Town contains a total of 30 libraries. Among the libraries in the city are the Penang State Library at Scotland Road and the Penang Digital Library at Green Lane. The latter, which was opened by the Penang state government in 2016, is Malaysia's first digital library and houses a digitalised collection of over 3,000 publications.

Health care 

The numerous public and private hospitals in George Town has helped the city to emerge as the centre of medical tourism in Malaysia. The Penang General Hospital, administered and funded by the Ministry of Health, is the main public hospital in George Town and serves as the tertiary referral hospital within northern Malaysia. It is complemented by the Balik Pulau Hospital, which is also managed by the country's Ministry of Health.

There are also 54 government-run clinics throughout George Town, supported by 11 private hospitals and 352 private clinics. The private hospitals within George Town include Penang Adventist Hospital, Island Hospital, Gleneagles Medical Centre, Loh Guan Lye Specialists Centre, Lam Wah Ee Hospital, Mount Miriam Cancer Hospital and Pantai Hospital.

George Town became the first Malaysian city to install public automated external defibrillators (AEDs), with the launch of the first device in Komtar in 2015. Since then, AEDs have been installed at several public locations throughout the city.

Media

Print 
George Town was once the centre of Malaysia's print media. The country's first newspaper – the Prince of Wales Island Gazette – was established in the city in 1806. One of Malaysia's top dailies currently in circulation, The Star, was founded in George Town in the 1970s, while the country's oldest Chinese newspaper, Kwong Wah Yit Poh, was also founded in the city in 1910.

In 2011, the then Chief Minister of Penang, Lim Guan Eng, officiated the launch of the Penang edition of Time Out. This version of the international listings magazine is currently published in three versions – an annual guide, a website and a mobile app.

The Penang state government also publishes its own multi-lingual newspaper, Buletin Mutiara, which is circulated for free every fortnight. The Penang-centric newspaper focuses on the current issues affecting Penang.

Television 
Due to its well-preserved heritage cityscape, George Town served as the filming location for a number of movies, such as Anna and the King, Lust, Caution and You Mean the World to Me, the latter of which is the first movie to be filmed entirely in Penang Hokkien. Singaporean drama series, The Little Nyonya and The Journey: Our Homeland, were also shot within the UNESCO zone. In addition, the city was one of the pit-stops of The Amazing Race 16, The Amazing Race Asia 4 and The Amazing Race Asia 5.

Radio 
The available FM radio stations in George Town, both government (including Penang-based Mutiara FM) and commercial, are as listed below.

Transportation

Land 
Development of George Town's streets and roads is an ongoing process that dates back to the early years of British rule. The city's oldest streets, including Light Street, Beach Street, Chulia Street and Pitt Street, were arranged in a grid pattern.

The Tun Dr Lim Chong Eu Expressway runs along the eastern coastline of Penang Island between the city centre and the Penang International Airport, linking both locations with the Bayan Lepas Free Industrial Zone and the Penang Bridge. The George Town Inner Ring Road and the Penang Middle Ring Road are the two major ring roads around the city centre. The city centre is also linked with the western parts of Penang Island, such as Balik Pulau, via the pan-island Federal Route 6.

Both the -long Penang Bridge and the -long Second Penang Bridge link George Town with the rest of Peninsular Malaysia. The former bridge was completed in 1985, while the latter, opened in 2014, is currently the longest bridge in Southeast Asia.

Public transportation

George Town was once a pioneer of public transportation in British Malaya. The city's first tram system, then powered by steam, commenced operations in the 1880s. While the tram lines have since been disused, another colonial legacy, the trishaw, remains in use throughout the city, albeit catering primarily for tourists.

Today, buses form the backbone of public transportation within George Town. Rapid Penang, with over 30 routes on Penang Island, is the sole public bus service provider within George Town. In addition, open-topped double deckers, known as Hop-On Hop-Off buses, have been introduced for tourists in the city. Meanwhile, the Penang Hill Railway is a funicular railway to the peak of Penang Hill.

Efforts are also being undertaken to promote pedestrianisation and the use of bicycles as a greener transportation mode. Dedicated cycling lanes have been marked throughout the city and in 2016, George Town became the first Malaysian city to operate a public bicycle-sharing service, with the launch of LinkBike.

Air
It serves as the main airport for northern Malaysia, with frequent links to major Asian cities such as Kuala Lumpur, Singapore, Bangkok, Jakarta, Ho Chi Minh City, Taipei, Hong Kong, Guangzhou and Doha. It is also a hub for two Malaysian low-cost carriers – AirAsia and Firefly. The airport is Malaysia's second busiest in terms of cargo traffic and recorded the third highest passenger traffic of all Malaysian airports .

Sea

The Port of Penang consists of seven facilities along the Penang Strait, including Swettenham Pier in George Town. Renovated in 2009 as a cruise shipping terminal, Swettenham Pier is one of the major tourist entry points into George Town. , the pier recorded 1.35 million tourist arrivals, thereby surpassing Port Klang as the busiest port-of-call in Malaysia for cruise shipping. The pier has also attracted some of the world's largest cruise liners, such as the RMS Queen Mary 2.

A number of cruise ships call Swettenham Pier as their homeport, bringing tourists into and out of George Town towards regional destinations like Phuket and Singapore. Occasionally, the pier hosts warships as well, including those from Singapore, Thailand and the United States.

Ferry 

Rapid Ferry is a cross-strait shuttle ferry service that connects George Town with the town of Butterworth on the Malay Peninsula. It is the oldest ferry service in Malaysia, dating back to 1894 when the first passenger ferry commenced operations. Currently, six ferries ply the Penang Strait between George Town and Butterworth daily.

International relations

Consulates 
Several nations have either established their consulates or appointed honorary-consulates within George Town.

Sister cities
George Town has eight sister cities.

The State of Penang also has a sister area partnership with Kanagawa Prefecture in Japan, which was ratified in 1991.

Sister subdivision
  Kanagawa Prefecture, Japan

Friendship cities 
In addition to the sister cities and areas, George Town has inked five other friendship city agreements.
  Sanya, China
  Zhongshan, China
  Busan, South Korea
  Changwon, South Korea
  Kaohsiung, Taiwan
In 2013, the State of Penang signed a friendship state agreement with Hainan Province in China.

Friendship subdivision
  Hainan Province, China

See also 

 International rankings of George Town

References

Literature
 Suet Leng Khoo; Narimah Samat; Nurwati Badarulzaman; Sharifah Rohayah Sheikh Dawood The Promise and Perils of the Island City of George Town (Penang) as a Creative City. Urban Island Studies. (2015).
 Francis, Ric; Ganley, Colin. Penang Trams, Trolleybuses & Railways: Municipal Transport History 1880s–1963. Penang: Areca Books. (2006, 2nd ed. 2012) .
 Khoo Salma Nasution. More Than Merchants: A History of the German-speaking Community in Penang, 1800s–1940s. Areca Books. (2006). 
 Ooi Cheng Ghee. Portraits of Penang: Little India. Areca Books. (2011).

External links

 Penang Island (George Town) City Council

 
Populated places in Penang
Populated coastal places in Malaysia
Populated places established in 1786
World Heritage Sites in Malaysia
Ports and harbours of Malaysia
State capitals in Malaysia
1786 establishments in Asia
1786 establishments in the British Empire